Senecio cedrorum is a shrub species of the genus Senecio and family Asteraceae and endemic to Madagascar.

References

External links

cedrorum
Endemic flora of Madagascar
Near threatened plants